Elias Vonck (1605, Amsterdam – 1652, Amsterdam), was a Dutch Golden Age painter.

Biography
According to the RKD he worked in Poland 1631-1639, where son Jan was born. He is known for portraits, still lifes, hunting and farm scenes with animals.

References

Elias Vonck on Artnet

1605 births
1652 deaths
Dutch Golden Age painters
Dutch male painters
Painters from Amsterdam